The Old Jacoby Creek School is an historic building located in Bayside, California.  
A bell tower serves as the dominant architectural element and the structure contains both weatherboard and shingling on the exterior.

History
The original school was active from 1903 to 1924 but the structure was not listed on the National Register of Historic Places until 1985, by which time it had become an individual residence.

In 2003, the building briefly housed the Laurel Tree Learning Center charter school.  However, the school was forced to move because of serious code violations including no sprinklers or alarm system.

In 2007, the building was purchased and renovated (including the addition of solar power) by Internet audio streaming and podcasting service provider StreamGuys and currently houses their main business and support offices, as well as the business offices for Humboldt Hot Sauce, the workout studio for Old School Hot Yoga, and two private apartments.

Sources

See also

 National Register of Historic Places listings in Humboldt County, California

References

External links
 Travel site with photograph
 Laurel Tree Learning Center charter school

Bayside, California
School buildings on the National Register of Historic Places in California
School buildings completed in 1903
Towers completed in 1903
Bell towers in the United States
Educational institutions established in 1903
Educational institutions disestablished in 1924
Defunct schools in California
Schools in Humboldt County, California
1903 establishments in California
National Register of Historic Places in Humboldt County, California